Monique Iannella (born 1 August 1996) is an Australian football (soccer) player, who played in the Australian W-League for Adelaide United and Melbourne City and in the American college system for the Texas Longhorns and for the Hofstra Pride.

Club career

Adelaide United, 2013–2015
Iannella made her debut in the Australian W-League for Adelaide United during the 2013/14 season. She made 8 appearances for the club primarily playing in the midfielder position. Adelaide finished the regular season in 6th place with a  record. Iannella returned to Adelaide for the 2014/2015 season and started in all 7 matches in which she appeared.  The team finished in seventh place during the regular season with a  record.

Melbourne City, 2015–2016
In September 2015, it was announced Iannella had signed with Melbourne City for the 2015/2016 season playing primarily in a defender position.

Texas Longhorns
In June 2016, Iannella moved to Texas to study at the University of Texas at Austin and joined their soccer team, the Texas Longhorns.

Hofstra Pride
In 2017, Iannella transferred to Hofstra Pride where she plays alongside countrywoman Emily Hulbert.

International career
Ianella represented Australia at the 2015 AFF Women's Championship in Vietnam after helping the team qualify in November 2014.

See also

 Women's association football in Australia

References

External links
 Melbourne City player profile
 Adelaide United player profile
 

1996 births
Living people
Australian women's soccer players
Adelaide United FC (A-League Women) players
Melbourne City FC (A-League Women) players
Texas Longhorns women's soccer players
Hofstra Pride women's soccer players
A-League Women players
Women's association football midfielders